The Purifiers is a 2004 action film directed by Richard Jobson, and starring Dominic Monaghan. It was produced by Chris Atkins.

Cast
 Kevin McKidd as Moses
 Gordon Alexander as John
 Rachel Grant as Li
 Dominic Monaghan as Sol
 Amber Sainsbury as Frances
 Robyn Kerr as Sam
 Jamie Hayden as Raz

External links
 
 

2004 films
2004 science fiction action films
British science fiction action films
English-language Scottish films
British martial arts films
Scottish films
Scottish science fiction
2000s English-language films
2000s British films